Reshma Mane is an Indian female wrestler who hails from Vedange in Kolhapurdistrict of Maharashtra. She competes in the 62 kg category of freestyle wrestling.

Career 
Mane first garnered attention by winning gold in both senior and junior National Championship of wrestling in 2016. She also won a Bronze medal in Asian Cadet Championship held in Bishke, Kyrgyzstan.
She was also selected to represent India in the U-23 World Championships in 2017. Reshma was also a part of the Indian contingent that participated in 2014 Youth Olympics.

Recently, she became the first female wrestler from Maharashtra to take part in Vivo PWL 3.

References

Indian female sport wrestlers
Sport wrestlers from Maharashtra
Living people
Year of birth missing (living people)